During the 1994–95 English football season, Swindon Town F.C. competed in the Football League First Division.

Season summary
After a bright start to the 1994–95 season, a poor run of five defeats in six games resulted in Gorman's sacking in November 1994 with Swindon struggling near the foot of Division One. 33-year-old Manchester City midfielder Steve McMahon took over but, despite a run to the League Cup semi-finals, Swindon suffered a second successive relegation and slipped into Division Two.

Final league table

Results
Swindon Town's score comes first

Legend

Football League First Division

FA Cup

League Cup

Squad

References

Swindon Town F.C. seasons
Swindon Town